Dundeel, or It’s a Dundeel as he is known in Australia, is a champion New Zealand Thoroughbred racehorse. He is the fifth and most recent winner of the Australian Triple Crown.

Background
Dundeel is a bay colt trained by Murray Baker and Andrew Forsman at Murray's Cambridge stables.  When in Australia Dundeel was managed by son Bjorn Baker at his Warwick Farm stables. The story of his life is provided on his website.

His sire High Chaparral won Epsom Derby in 2002 and the Breeders' Cup Turf in 2002 and 2003. As a stallion he is best known as the sire of So You Think.

Racing career
Dundeel started his racing career with five straight wins culminating in the 2012 Spring Champion Stakes.  He had previously added to his unbeaten record with another win in the Group 3 Gloaming Stakes (1800m) also at Randwick in Sydney.

In the autumn of 2013 he became the first horse to win the coveted Australian Triple Crown since Octagonal in 1996.  He won the first leg in the 2013 Randwick Guineas (1600m).  This victory was followed up by a comfortable 6.8 length win in the 2013 Rosehill Guineas (2000m).  He completed the Australian Triple Crown in style with a 6 length win in the Australian Derby (2400m) and in doing so he also became the first ever to do so since the first leg moved from the Canterbury Guineas in 2006. He also becomes the first horse to win a clean sweep of the four major Group 1 three-year-old races run in Sydney, having previously won the 2012 Spring Champion Stakes (2000m), an Australian Thoroughbred horse race for three-year-olds at Set Weights, raced at the Randwick Racecourse, Sydney with prize money of A$400,000.  His fantastic three-year-old season was recognised in receiving the 2013 NSW Champion Horse of the Year.

Dundeel continued to develop as a four-year-old and created history in becoming the first horse to beat the previously unbeaten Atlantic Jewel in the Group 1 2013 Underwood Stakes (1800m) at Caulfield in Melbourne and then proceeded to win the richest race to ever be run on a Sydney track in the $4M Queen Elizabeth Stakes.  
In reflecting on It's a Dundeel's career, his trainer Murray Baker, and champion jockey James McDonald, who has partnered him in all but one start, both describe Dundeel as the best horse they have ever trained and ridden respectively.  Mick Kent, trainer of the Australian Derby runner-up Philippi, described Dundeel as “the best horse in Australia - as good as the mare (Black Caviar)”.  Black Caviar's breeder Rick Jamieson has described Dundeel as a champion and "the best three-year-old we have seen for a while."

His victory in the 2014 Queen Elizabeth Stakes earned him a Timeform rating of 129 at the conclusion of his racing career, which ranks him as the 21st equal highest rated Australian racehorse since the 1950s.

Stud career
On 21 April 2014, two days after his victory in the Queen Elizabeth Stakes, it was announced that It's a Dundeel was to be retired to stud.  This was met with mixed reactions as his trainer Murray Baker was of the opinion that the best was yet to come from the champion colt and others were surprised that his stud fee was so modest given his achievements.

Dundeel stands at Arrowfield Stud, the largest Australian owned thoroughbred stud farm.

Notable stock

c = colt, f = filly, g = gelding

Pedigree

See also

 Thoroughbred racing in New Zealand
 Thoroughbred racing in Australia

References

2009 racehorse births
Racehorses bred in New Zealand
Racehorses trained in New Zealand
Racehorses trained in Australia
Thoroughbred family 22-b